The 2020 CONCACAF Men's Olympic Qualifying Championship was an international football tournament that was held in Mexico from 18 to 30 March 2021. The eight national teams involved in the tournament were required to register a squad of twenty players, three of whom had to be goalkeepers.

Each national team had to submit a provisional list with up to fifty players to FIFA and CONCACAF at least thirty days before their first match in the tournament. The final list of twenty players per national team had to be submitted to FIFA and CONCACAF up to ten days before the start of the tournament. Once the final lists had been submitted, teams were only be permitted to make replacements in cases of force majeure or serious injuries up to 24 hours before their first match, where the replacement players needed to be in the preliminary squad.

The provisional lists were published by CONCACAF on 23 February 2021. The final lists were published by CONCACAF on 11 March 2021.

All registered players had to have been born on or after 1 January 1997 (Regulations Article 13). The age listed for each player is on 18 March 2021, the first day of the tournament. A flag is included for coaches who are of a different nationality than their own national team. Players marked in bold have been capped at full international level.

Group A

Mexico
Head coach: Jaime Lozano

The 50-man provisional squad was announced on 23 February 2021. The 20-man final squad was announced on 11 March 2021.

United States
Head coach: Jason Kreis

The 48-man provisional squad was announced by CONCACAF on 23 February 2021, and was reduced to 31 players on 1 March 2021. The 20-man final squad was announced on 11 March 2021. On 18 March 2021, midfielder Ulysses Llanez was ruled out due to an ankle injury and was replaced by Tanner Tessmann.

Costa Rica
Head coach: Douglas Sequeira

The 50-man provisional squad was announced by CONCACAF on 23 February 2021, The 20-man final squad was announced on 10 March 2021.

Dominican Republic
Coach:  Jacques Passy

The 50-man provisional squad was announced by CONCACAF on 23 February 2020. The 20-man final squad was announced on 8 March 2021. Defender Lean Torres withdrew injured and was replaced by Josué Báez on 18 March 2021.

Group B

Honduras
Head coach:  Fabián Coito

The 48-man provisional squad was announced by CONCACAF on 23 February 2021. The 20-man final squad was announced on 8 March 2021.

Canada
Head coach: Mauro Biello

The 50-man provisional squad was announced on 23 February 2021. The 20-man final squad was announced on 10 March 2021. On 19 March, defender Thomas Meilleur-Giguère and forward Kris Twardek were replaced on the roster by Diyaeddine Abzi and Mohamed Farsi due to medical reasons.

El Salvador
Head coach:  Hugo Pérez

The 33-man provisional squad was announced by CONCACAF on 23 February 2021. The 20-man final squad was announced on 7 March 2021.

Haiti
Head coach: Webens Princimé

The 50-man provisional squad was announced on 21 February 2021. The 20-man final squad was announced on 10 March 2021.

References

Squads